A  wrist brace  is a supportive garment worn around the wrist to reinforce and protect it against strains and sprains during strong use, or as a splint to help healing. Wrist braces are common accessories in injury rehabilitation processes involving the wrist. They immobilize the joint and provide heat and compression to the wrist bones and ligaments. In severe cases, they incorporate metal "spines" to better immobilize the joint.

Uses

They are indicated for wrist trauma with and without fracture, immobilization of the joint, postoperative synovitis, recurrent degenerative sprains or articulation inflammations, among many other cases.

In rehabilitation to immobilize the wrist into a neutral position, which "theoretically  minimizes stress at the repair site".

Use in sports
The wrist braces have a protective role in activities where wrists require extraordinary effort like weight lifting or bodybuilding. In these cases, using pressure around the wrist may prevent sprains and strains.

Finally, are used in sports which force the wrist play, as those played with a paddle or racket (tennis, paddle, badminton) or hockey. Some times they have a double purpose: protect the wrist from injuries and wipe the sweat from the forehead. For this purpose they are made in absorbent materials such as cotton or plush.

In artistic gymnastics, gymnasts will sometimes wear wrist guards to absorb the impact on the skills they perform. The guards are commonly worn for Vaulting and Floor exercises. The design is modified between women and men.

See also 
Ankle brace
Open wrist
Wristband

References

External links

Orthopedic braces
Sportswear
Wrist
Handwear
Protective gear